is the 7th single by the Japanese girl idol group 9nine,  released in Japan on July 20, 2011, on the label SME Records (a subsidiary of Sony Music Entertainment Japan).

The physical CD single debuted at number 15 in the Oricon weekly singles chart.

Background 
The single was released in three versions: two limited editions (Limited Edition A and Limited Edition B) and a regular edition. Both limited editions included a bonus DVD with two versions of the music video for the title track and a different making-of video. Each edition had a different cover.

Track listing

Charts

References

External links 
  (The video is available only in Japan.)
 Limited Edition A at Sony Music

2011 singles
Japanese-language songs
9nine songs
2011 songs
SME Records singles